Phạm Văn Trà (born 19 August 1937) is a Vietnamese politician who served as Vietnam's Minister of Defense from 1997 to 2006.

Phạm Văn Trà was previously Chief of the General Staff of the People's Army of Vietnam and Vice-Minister of Defense (Dec 1995–1997), and a four-star General. He replaced Đoàn Khuê as minister of defense in September 1997.

References 

Government ministers of Vietnam
Vietnamese generals
1937 births
Living people
Members of the 8th Politburo of the Communist Party of Vietnam
Members of the 9th Politburo of the Communist Party of Vietnam
Members of the 7th Central Committee of the Communist Party of Vietnam
Members of the 8th Central Committee of the Communist Party of Vietnam
Members of the 9th Central Committee of the Communist Party of Vietnam
Ministers of Defence of Vietnam
People from Bắc Ninh province